North Carolina Mutual Building, also known as the Blue Palace Tea Shop and Barber Shop, is a historic commercial building located at Columbia, South Carolina. It was built in 1909 by the North Carolina Mutual Life Insurance Company, and is a three-story, rectangular, brick commercial block. The building housed African-American businesses, professionals, and institutions during the years of Jim Crow segregation.  It is located in the Washington Street business district, the city's black downtown.

It was added to the National Register of Historic Places in 1995.

References

African-American history of South Carolina
Commercial buildings on the National Register of Historic Places in South Carolina
Buildings and structures completed in 1909
Buildings and structures in Columbia, South Carolina
National Register of Historic Places in Columbia, South Carolina